Marshalling is an equitable doctrine applied in the context of lending. It was described by Lord Hoffmann as:

In the United States, Justice Stone described that:

General principles

It has been held that marshalling applies to all forms of secured indebtedness, including liens.

A claim for marshalling will not be allowed by the courts where it would be unjust or unfair to allow the junior creditor to marshal, and therefore:

It cannot interfere or prejudice the position of the senior creditor.
It cannot prejudice third parties.
It must be brought in a fair and timely fashion

Marshalling is not available to a second mortgagee where the first mortgagee is contractually bound to look first to the other property to satisfy the debt due to him.

While quite similar to the doctrine of subrogation, the two are quite distinct equitable remedies:

 Subrogation applies where there is only one debt.
 Subrogation entitles one party to stand in the shoes of another party having repaid indebtedness due to that party, while marshalling requires separate debts due from a debtor to separate secured creditors at the outset.
 The restitutionary principles applicable to subrogation have no application to marshalling.

United States

US jurisprudence has expanded upon the British and Commonwealth authorities, declaring that the requirement for a common debtor means that marshalling is not available where the two funds in question consist of an interest in estate property and an interest in property of a non-debtor, subject to certain exceptions:

It has been applied where a non-debtor (typically a corporate debtor’s controlling shareholder or guarantor) qualifies as the “alter ego” of the debtor, or where the non-debtor has rendered the debtor inadequately capitalized.
The debtor’s obligation and not solely the non-debtor’s obligation, may equitably be deemed a “capital contribution” to the debtor and hence subject to marshalling.
Courts have invoked marshalling where the non-debtor has engaged in inequitable conduct such as fraud, breach of fiduciary duty or unjust enrichment.
It has been applied against non-debtor shareholders solely for the equitable purpose of preserving a distribution for the debtor’s unsecured creditors.

In certain circumstances, that jurisprudence has also held that, while subrogation may normally render payment of a debt by a guarantor outside the scope of marshalling, equitable subordination may bring the assets of a guarantor within its reach.

Civil law jurisdictions

While marshalling is found only in common law jurisdictions, similar concepts exist in several of those governed by civil law.

Scots law possesses the equivalent doctrine of "catholic securities", and Lord Reed, in a 2013 judgment of the United Kingdom Supreme Court described its effect as being similar to marshalling:

A similar concept is found in art. 2754 of the Civil Code of Quebec, which states:

Recent jurisprudence has suggested that this provision produces a result equivalent to marshalling.

References

English law
Equity (law)
Common law legal terminology